Pennyville is an unincorporated community in Reeve Township, Daviess County, Indiana.

Geography

References

Unincorporated communities in Daviess County, Indiana
Unincorporated communities in Indiana